Harold Sadler, often known as Hal Sadler, is an American architect, designer and philanthropist in Southern California. He graduated from Arizona State University's School of Architecture in 1952 and proceeded to USC where he obtained his master's degree. His early work in the realm of architecture began at a Los Angeles-based architecture firm Jones and Emmons, under the influence of his mentor, A. Quincy Jones. In 1957 Hal moved to San Diego, California where he collaborated with Thomas Tucker and Ed Bennett. The three went on to create Tucker Sadler and Bennett, a successful architecture firm. This firm designed the original FedMart Stores (which became Price Club, and then Costco) and went on to design popular and defining projects including the San Diego State University Library, First National Bank of Southern California Building (now Union Bank), and both Argo and Blake Hall on UC San Diego's campus in La Jolla, California. Hal is considered by some to be the most humble architect of his time; rarely acknowledging his many accomplishments and influential contributions to the world of modern architecture.

References

Arizona State University alumni
American architects
USC School of Architecture alumni